Samudrala Venugopal Chary  is an Indian politician and was Member of Parliament of India for three consecutive terms. He was a member of the 11th, 12th and the 13th Lok Sabhas. Chary was also a member of the Andhra Pradesh Legislative Assembly. Chary represented the Adilabad constituency of Andhra Pradesh and is a member of the Telangana Rashtra Samithi political party.

Early life and education
Samudrala Venugopal Chary was born in Nirmal, Adilabad district in the state of Andhra Pradesh. He attended the Osmania University & Government Homoeo Medical College in the city of Hyderabad. He attained M.A (sociology) and D.H.M.S degrees. Chary is a Medical Practitioner by profession.

Political career
Samudrala Venugopal Chary has been in active politics since early 1980s. Prior to becoming a M.P he was also MLA (three straight terms) from Nirmal.
Chary was member of several committees and was also Minister.

Posts Held

See also
11th, 12th and 13th Lok Sabha
Adilabad (Lok Sabha constituency)
Andhra Pradesh Legislative Assembly
Government of India
Lok Sabha
Nirmal (Assembly constituency)
Parliament of India
Politics of India
Telugu Desam Party

References

India MPs 1996–1997
India MPs 1998–1999
India MPs 1999–2004
1959 births
Living people
Lok Sabha members from Andhra Pradesh
People from Adilabad
Telangana Rashtra Samithi politicians
Telugu Desam Party politicians